Aneta Havlíčková (born 3 July 1987) is a Czech female volleyball player. She plays for Lokomotiv Baku.

Career
Havlíčková won the 2015–16 Azerbaijan Super League bronze medal with Lokomotiv Baku and she was awarded Best Scorer.

Clubs
  Policejní Volejbalový Klub Olymp Praga (2006–2007)
  Tiboni Urbino (2009–2010)
  Yamamay Busto Arsizio (2010–2012)
  Lokomotiv Baku (2012–2013)
  Fenerbahçe (2013-2014)
  Lokomotiv Baku (2014-2016)
  Savino Del Bene Scandicci (2016-2017)
  Türk Hava Yolları Spor Kulübü (2017- )

Awards

Individuals
 2012 European League "Most Valuable Player"
 2011–12 CEV Cup "Most Valuable Player"
 2012–13 Azerbaijan Women's Volleyball Super League "Best Scorer"
 2015–16 Azerbaijan Super League "Best Scorer"

National
 2012 European League -  Champion

Clubs
 2011-12 Italian Championship -  Champion, with Yamamay Busto Arsizio
 2011-12 Italian Cup -  Champion, with Yamamay Busto Arsizio
 2011–12 CEV Cup -  Champion, with Yamamay Busto Arsizio
 2013–14 CEV Cup -  Champion, with Fenerbahçe
 2015–16 Azerbaijan Super League –  Bronze medal, with Lokomotiv Baku

References

1987 births
Living people
Czech women's volleyball players
Fenerbahçe volleyballers
Sportspeople from Mladá Boleslav
Czech expatriate sportspeople in Italy
Czech expatriate sportspeople in Turkey
Expatriate volleyball players in Italy
Expatriate volleyball players in Azerbaijan
Expatriate volleyball players in Turkey
Opposite hitters